Thenardia is a genus of flowering plants in the family Apocynaceae, first described as a genus in 1819. It is native to Mexico and Honduras.

Species
 Thenardia chiapensis J.K.Williams - Chiapas, Oaxaca, Honduras
 Thenardia floribunda Kunth  - Colima, Guerrero, México State, Michoacán, Oaxaca, Jalisco, Morelos
 Thenardia galeottiana Baill. - Chiapas, Oaxaca, Guerrero

Formerly included
 Thenardia corymbosa = Forsteronia schomburgkii  
 Thenardia laurifolia = Forsteronia laurifolia  
 Thenardia scabra = Parsonsia scabra 
 Thenardia umbellata = Forsteronia umbellata

References

Apocynaceae genera
Echiteae